Etz Hayim ("Tree of Life" in Hebrew) is a term of Judaism used in a variety of ways.

Etz Hayim, Etz Hayyim, Eitz Chaim, or  Etz Chaim may also refer to:

Tree of life (biblical), a mythical tree
 Tree of life (Kabbalah), a mystical symbol
 Etz Hayim (book), a primary text of Kabbalah by Hayim Vital
 Etz Hayim Humash, Conservative Judaism Torah with commentary
 Etz Hayyim Synagogue in Chania
 Etz Chaim Synagogue in Portland
 Etz Chaim Synagogue (Athens)
 Etz Chaim Synagogue, Thanet

See also
 Etz Ahayim Synagogue in Istanbul
 Etz Chaim Yeshiva (disambiguation)